Tăieturii River may refer to:
 Tăieturii River (Neagra Șarului), in Suceava County, Romania
 Tăieturii River (Târnava Mare), in Harghita County, Romania